Welbeck is a village in Nottinghamshire, England, slightly to the south-west of Worksop. The village population is included in the civil parish of Holbeck.

Welbeck became a coal-mining centre in 1912 and has a famous stately home, Welbeck Abbey, home of the Dukes of Portland, and which was founded in the twelfth century as a monastery.

The cricketer Ted Alletson, who held a batting world record for 50 years, is from Welbeck.

Archduke Franz Ferdinand accepted an invitation from the Duke of Portland to stay at Welbeck Abbey and arrived with his wife, Sophie, by train at Worksop on 22 November 1913. This was almost a year before his assassination, which triggered the First World War. The Archduke narrowly avoided being killed in a freak hunting accident during his stay.

Colliery
The Welbeck Colliery operated from 1912 to 2011, with a maximum of 1,400 miners producing 1.5 million tons per year. It was eventually operated by UK Coal after the dissolution of the National Coal Board. In 2010 UK Coal were fined £1.2 million of safety breaches at Welbeck Colliery that resulted in the death of a worker.

References

External links

Villages in Nottinghamshire
Coal mining disasters in England
Bassetlaw District